Events from 1687 in the Kingdom of Scotland

Incumbents
Monarch – James VII 
Secretary of State – John Drummond, 1st Earl of Melfort

Events
 12 February – Declaration of Indulgence proclaimed by James VII, a first step towards freedom of religion
 29 May – Order of the Thistle founded

Births
unknown date
 George Douglas, 2nd Earl of Dumbarton (died 1749)

Deaths
unknown date
 James Aitken (bishop) (born 1612/13)

See also
 Timeline of Scottish history

References

 
1680s in Scotland